The following list sorts 70 countries according to their number of diplomatic missions in 2022. Also indicated are the number of different missions abroad such as embassies, consulates, permanent missions and of other diplomatic representations. All data is from the Global Diplomacy Index 2019 of the Lowy Institute.

Notes

  The European Union (EU) is an economic and political union of  Member States. As the EU is not a country, the EU is not ranked country on the list.

References 

diplomatic missions

diplomatic missions